Bangladesh College of Nursing is the first and only nursing college in Bangladesh and is located in Mohakhali, Dhaka, Bangladesh.

History
Bangladesh College of Nursing was established in 1970 in Mohakhali, Dhaka. In 1978 the college became affiliated with the University of Dhaka. In the 1990s the college diploma program was suspended and it now provides BSc in Nursing and BSc in Public Health Nursing.

References

Research institutes in Bangladesh
Government agencies of Bangladesh
1970 establishments in East Pakistan
Organisations based in Dhaka
Nursing schools in Bangladesh
Educational Institutions in Bangladesh
Health sciences schools in Bangladesh